Laurie Elliott (born January 18, 1971) is a Canadian actress, voice actress, television writer, and stand-up comedian. She is best known as the voice of Jo from Total Drama. Currently she is a writer of Corn & Peg.

Career
She has appeared in The Red Green Show, and won the 2006 Canadian Comedy Award as Best Female Stand-up.  She is also a member of the sketch comedy duo Kevlor-2000 with Kevin MacDonald.

In 2003, Elliott participated in an April Fool's prank staged by Canada's Comedy Network, which announced that she was slated to star in a new remake of the 1970s Canadian sitcom The Trouble with Tracy.

Elliott participated in the Canadian live comedy show Video on Trial which also starred fellow Canadian comedians such as Debra DiGiovanni, Ron Sparks and Nikki Payne.

Elliot starred in Atomic Betty as Noah Parker, Rodney Patella in Moville Mysteries, and voiced Jo on Skatoony, Total Drama Revenge of the Island and Total Drama: All-Stars. Elliot has also written quite a few episodes of the Total Drama television series, including the Total Drama World Tour episodes "Slap Slap Revolution", "The EX-Files", "Aftermath Aftermayhem" and "African Lying Safari", the Total Drama: Revenge of the Island episodes "Ice Ice Baby", "The Treasure Island of Dr. McLean" and "The Enchanted Franken-Forest", the Total Drama: All-Stars episodes "Food Fright", "Suckers Punched", and "The Obsta-Kill Course", the Total Drama: Pahkitew Island episodes "I Love You, Grease Pig", "A Blast from the Past", and "Three Zones and a Baby", and the Total Drama spin-off series Total Drama Presents: The Ridonculous Race episodes "French is an Eiffel Language", "Brazilian Pain Forest", and "New Beijinging". She is currently writing episodes of Corn & Peg.

Awards and nominations

References

External links

Laurie Elliott Diamondfield Entertainment
Laurie Elliott TV.com
Stand-up on YouTube

1971 births
Living people
Actresses from Montreal
Anglophone Quebec people
Canadian film actresses
Canadian stand-up comedians
Canadian television actresses
Canadian voice actresses
Canadian women comedians
Comedians from Montreal
Canadian Comedy Award winners